Cingetorix, meaning "marching king" or "king of warriors", is a Celtic name borne by two chieftains of the 1st century BC, as related by Julius Caesar in his De Bello Gallico:

 Cingetorix (Gaul), one of the two chieftains struggling for the supremacy of the Treveri of Gaul. 
 Cingetorix (Briton), one of the four kings of Kent during Caesar's second expedition to Britain in 54 BC, alongside Segovax, Carvilius and Taximagulus.